Sulpitia Lodovica Cesis was born on 15 May 1577 in Modena, Italy. She was an Italian composer as well as a well-regarded lutenist. Her father was Count Annibale Cesis and he gave 300 pieces of gold for her dowry when she entered the Augustinian convent in Modena in 1593.  She was a nun at the convent of Saint Geminiano in Modena, although some sources report it as Saint Agostino. Her only known work is a volume of Motetti Spirituali, which she wrote in 1619.

Aspects of Motetti Spirituali

It is composed of 23 motets for 2–12 voices. Although most of the motets are written in Latin, four are written in Italian. Some scholars believe that the piece was composed earlier than 1619 because of its style. Unlike her contemporaries, her work contains indications for instruments such as cornetts, trombones, violones, and archviolones. Her 12-voice works are also especially different from the 2-3 voiced works popular in the 17th century  A bass part exists as well, which is interesting considering that this music was written for a group of cloistered nuns. One explanation is that this part was for the organ or viola da gamba. Another is that low parts may have been sung an octave higher than written, as she wrote this direction for some sections.  

Cesis dedicated her collection to another nun of the same name, Anna Maria Cesis, who lived at the Convent of Santa Lucia in Rome. Both Sulpitia Cesis's and Anna Maria Cesis's convents were well known for their music.

Sulpitia Cesis is mentioned in Giovanni Battista Spaccini's chronicle of life in Modena, as the composer of a motet which was performed at the doors of San Geminiano in 1596 during a religious procession.

Example of Sulpitia Cesis's work
"Mary Magdalena et altera Maria"

This song was not intended as a congregational hymn and is an excerpt from Matthew 28:1-7

Translation: 
Mary Magdalene and the other Mary/
went to the palace of the sepulcher.

It is Jesus whom you seek./
He is not here;/
he is risen as He said, and goes before you to Galilee./ 
There you will see Him.

For this text, "Cesis inserts melismatic phrases, underlining the name of Mary Magdalene and depicting the word surrexit (He is risen), in an otherwise dominantly homophonic texture and affectively uses harmonic suspension and dissonance to emphasize the miracle of Jesus' disappearance (Non est hic, "He is not there")".

Motet titles 

 Hodie gloriosus
 Cantate Domino
 Io so ferito si
 Jubilate Deo
 Il mio piu vago sole
 Pecco Signore
 Salve gemma confessorum
 O Crux splendidior
 Cantemus Domino
 Angelus ad pastores
 Benedictus Dominus
 Dulce nomen Jesu Christe
 Stabat Mater
 Hic est beatissimus
 Quest'è la bella [...]
 O Domine Jesu Christe
 Sub tuum praesidium
 Maria Magdalena
 Ecce ego Joannes
 Puer qui natus est
 Magi videntes stellam
 Ascendo ad Patrem
 Parvulus filius

Further reading
Three motets ed. Candace Smith, Bryn Mawr, Pa. :; Hildegard Pub. Co., 1996
Schleifer, Martha Furman and Glickman, Sylvia. Women composers: music through the ages v. 1. Composers born before 1599 New York : G.K. Hall, c1996- 
Cappella Artemisia CD recording of all 23 motets, 2003.

References
 "Sulpitia Cesis", Grove Music Online, ed. L. Macy (accessed September 13, 2006), grovemusic.com (subscription access).
Women Making Music: the Western Musical Tradition, 1150–1950 ed. J. Bowers and J. Tick. "The Emergence of Women Composers in Italy, 1566–1700" by Jane Bowers. Urbana, IL. 1986. 
 "Cesis, Sulpitia." Grove Music Online. Oxford Music Online. 6 Feb. 2011 <http://www.oxfordmusiconline.com/subscriber/article/grove/music/05332>.
 https://web.archive.org/web/20110708115034/http://www.cappella-artemisia.com/discography/572801
 http://www.stabatmater.info/cesis.htm 
 http://www.hildegard.com/composer_detail.php?id=47 
 https://books.google.com/books?id=XoXXjeuncjMC&pg=RA1-PA48&lpg=RA1-PA48&dq=sulpitia+cesis&source=bl&ots=o52YSu-RwT&sig=8-6YIdefEx1Drr7LXRTD6HkJ7UU&hl=en&ei=KvROTYW8OoG78gb3rvm6Dg&sa=X&oi=book_result&ct=result&resnum=5&ved=0CDMQ6AEwBDgU#v=onepage&q=sulpitia%20cesis&f=false
Smith, Candace (1996). Schleifer, Martha Furman; Glickman, Sylvia (eds.). Women Composers: Music Through the Ages. 1. New York: G.K. Hall. pp. 163-167.

Notes

1577 births
Year of death missing
Italian Baroque composers
Italian lutenists
Renaissance composers
Women classical composers